Marcel Vercammen (29 January 1918 – 19 May 1981) was a Belgian footballer. He played in seven matches for the Belgium national football team from 1944 to 1947.

References

External links
 

1918 births
1981 deaths
Belgian footballers
Belgium international footballers
Place of birth missing
Association footballers not categorized by position